Aviation Academy halt is a railway station on the Suphanburi Line located in Kamphaeng Saen Aviation Academy, Amphoe Kamphaeng Saen, Nakhon Pathom Province, Thailand. There are two platforms, on both sides of the track. The station is now operational and two trains stop at it.

References 

Railway stations in Thailand